Arnie Ramirez (born in Costa Rica) is an American football manager who last worked as head coach of Ramapo College in his home country.

Career

Ramirez started his managerial career with New York University as an assistant coach in 1970. From 1972 to 1976 he was appointed head coach at NYU. In 1976 to 1978 he was the head coach at Manhattanville College. From 1979 to 1998 he coached Long Island University. He is the winningest coach with 214 victories 145 losses and 25 ties. In 20 seasons as head coach, he led the team to four NCAA tournament appearances, two New York Regional Championships, and a pair of ECAC Tournament showings. In addition, he was responsible for four Metropolitan titles (1979-1982) and the 1989 and 1997 Northeast Conference crowns.
Ramirez helped to develop a remarkable nine All Americans and numerous all-conference honorees during his time in Brooklyn. He was also named the Metro Conference Coach of the Year for three straight seasons and selected by his peers as the New York Region’s top coach in 1985. Ramirez also played collegiately at LIU, serving as captain his junior and senior seasons (1968, 1969). In 1992, he was appointed head coach of the Puerto Rico national football team, a position he held until 1992.  Ramirez was inducted into the LIU Hall of Fame in 2006. After that, he coached Ramapo College women.
During the 1994 World Cup Ramirez was the team liaison for the Bolivia National Team.
When Major League Soccer started he was one of eight evaluators to start the league.

References

External links 
 How Puerto Rico's 'not-so Puerto Rican' team scored a World Cup shock
 Arnie Ramirez on training a young Gregg Berhalter and coaching Gio Savarese
 Our American Dream: Arnie Ramirez Builds Community Through Soccer
 THANKS FOR THE MEMORIES: And the laughter as well as Ramirez has LIU crowd in stitches 
 Former Men's Soccer Head Coach Arnie Ramirez on LIU Hall of Famer Giovanni Savarese& NYC Soccer

American soccer coaches
Living people
Year of birth missing (living people)